Martinez (Spanish: Martínez) was a mining settlement during the California Gold Rush in Tuolumne County, California.

References 

Former settlements in Tuolumne County, California
Tuolumne
Populated places in Tuolumne County, California
History of Tuolumne County, California